"Buffy vs. Dracula" is the season 5 premiere of the television series Buffy the Vampire Slayer. Buffy faces the infamous Count Dracula, who has come to Sunnydale to make her one of his brides. In the process, he turns Xander into a Renfield of sorts, and Giles becomes enthralled with the three sisters, much like Jonathan Harker in the novel. However, after a brief spell during which Buffy is mesmerized by the Count, she regains her usual composure and defeats him.

Plot 
On a stormy day, two men deliver a large crate to a residence, but when they drop it, a clawed hand breaks through the wood and attacks one of the men.

Giles has Willow start scanning books into a computer so that they can be resources for the gang to use. He then tells her that he is going back to England as he feels like Buffy and the gang no longer need him.

While patrolling, Buffy is confronted by a vampire who condenses from mist: he introduces himself as none other than Count Dracula himself. Buffy is starstruck, but when she tries to stake the legendary vampire, he disappears. Xander and Willow arrive to see Dracula before he turns into a bat and flies away. The women discuss how amazing Dracula is, and Riley and Xander both express their jealousy towards the infamous Dark Prince. Willow attempts to attract attention to Giles and his usefulness, but the gang seems oblivious.

As Xander is walking home alone, he encounters Dracula. Using his mysterious charms, the vampire persuades Xander to be his aide and lure the Slayer to him. Riley asks Spike about Dracula, but the former commando is warned that Dracula is too dangerous for him to take on alone. Buffy awakens to find Dracula in her bedroom, as Joyce had earlier invited him into their home. She is helpless against his powers and unable to stop him from biting her. When she wakes the next morning, she hides the puncture marks in her neck with a scarf.

Later, the gang discusses their plan of attack. Buffy seems distracted and after hearing about the truths of Dracula, she leaves abruptly. Riley follows her and forces her to take off the scarf to show the puncture marks on her neck. Everyone is shocked to see that she has been under the control of Dracula. Since Xander is under Dracula's power, he has a strange hunger for spiders and attempts to defend the powerful vampire to his friends. Xander volunteers to have Buffy stay safely at his place, Willow and Tara use magic to protect the Summers home, and Giles and Riley go after Dracula.

Xander locks Anya in the closet and takes the willing Slayer to his "Master" in hopes of getting immortality in return. After being left alone with Dracula, Buffy tries to take control and stake him, but he is easily able to make her put the stake down, telling her about all the things he will do for her while she struggles to regain control of herself. As Giles and Riley arrive at the castle, Xander tries to stop them from going after Dracula, but Riley knocks him out with one punch, while Giles finds himself seduced by the Three Sisters. Dracula offers his blood to Buffy, and she hesitantly takes a drink. A flash of memories allows Buffy to break his control over her. Riley rescues a reluctant Giles from the vampire sisters, and they go to save Buffy. Buffy and Dracula fight in a vicious battle, and finally Buffy stakes him. After they leave, Dracula comes back from the dust. Buffy is there and stakes him again, knowing he would come back. Dracula attempts to re-form again but is reminded by Buffy that she is "standing right here". He slips away in his mist-form.

Buffy tells Giles that she wants to be the Slayer again, to learn about her duties and her future. She asks him to be her Watcher again, which she accepts. Buffy comes home and announces to her mom that she is going out with Riley. As she enters her room, she finds a strange girl there going through her stuff. Joyce tells Buffy that she should take her sister with her if she goes out, much to both girls' chagrin.

Production
The vampire who was going to show Buffy a darker side of herself was originally envisioned as "just another vampire who rode a horse and was all cool," says writer Marti Noxon. "I kept saying, 'Like Dracula - until Joss Whedon said, "Why not Dracula? He's public domain."

Rudolf Martin, the actor who played Dracula had also played Vlad III Dracula, "the Impaler" (the real life inspiration for Bram Stoker's book Dracula and thus, the vampire Dracula) in the TV movie Dark Prince: The True Story of Dracula which aired on the USA Network a month after this episode aired. Near the end of the film, the story strays into fiction by having Vlad excommunicated by the Orthodox Church (this didn't happen in real life) before getting assassinated by his brother Radu (how Vlad actually died is unknown). Due to Vlad's violent life as shown in the film and the excommunication, he is denied entry to both Heaven and Hell and rises from the grave as a vampire and is implied to be one and the same as Count Dracula. The movie therefore has an unintended sense of continuity with the episode as both cast the same actor to play the same character.

Noxon says the scene in which Dracula implies that Buffy would "make an amazing vampire" thematically resonates with the questions of identity with which Buffy struggles throughout Season 5.

When questioning Dracula's identity, Buffy mentions having encountered "pimply and overweight" vampires who named themselves after Anne Rice's vampire character Lestat de Lioncourt. This is the first indication that some vampires appreciate Rice's perspective on vampirism; in contrast, "School Hard" and "Darla" depicted some vampires as having contempt for Rice's concepts.

Broadcast and release
"Buffy vs. Dracula" was first broadcast on September 26, 2000 on The WB Television Network. During its original broadcast, the episode was watched by 5.8 million viewers and received a Nielsen rating share of 3.9/6. This means that 3.9 percent of all households with a television viewed the episode, while among those households watching TV during this time period, six percent of them were actively watching the program. This was lower than the season three premiere, but higher than the season one and two premieres.

It was released on DVD as part of the fifth season on December 9, 2003.

See also
 Vampire film

References

External links

 

Buffy the Vampire Slayer (season 5) episodes
Television episodes about Dracula
2000 American television episodes
Television episodes written by Marti Noxon